This article lists the complete results of the group stage of the 2016 Uber Cup in Kunshan, China.

All times Chinese Standard Time (UTC+08:00)

Group A

China vs Malaysia

Denmark vs Spain

Denmark vs Malaysia

China vs Spain

Spain vs Malaysia

China vs Denmark

Group B

Chinese Taipei vs Mauritius

Korea vs United States

Korea vs Mauritius

Chinese Taipei vs United States

Mauritius vs United States

Korea vs Chinese Taipei

Group C

Thailand vs Hong Kong

Indonesia vs Bulgaria

Thailand vs Bulgaria

Indonesia vs Hong Kong

Bulgaria vs Hong Kong

Thailand vs Indonesia

Group D

India vs Australia

Japan vs Germany

India vs Germany

Japan vs Australia

Japan vs India

Australia vs Germany

References

External links
 Uber Cup Finals 2016

2016 Thomas & Uber Cup